Sonstorp is a locality situated in Finspång Municipality, Östergötland County, Sweden with 429 inhabitants in 2010.

Sports
The following sports clubs are located in Finspång Municipality:

 Sonstorps IK

References 

Populated places in Östergötland County
Populated places in Finspång Municipality